Buckhead Ridge is a census-designated place (CDP) in Glades County, Florida, United States. The population was 1,450 at the 2010 census. The community consists of a few small commercial developments and a large mobile home park. Most residential lots in the community abut canals that feed into Lake Okeechobee.

Geography
Buckhead Ridge is located at  (27.130819, -80.891041).

Demographics

As of the census of 2000, there were 1,390 people, 694 households, and 465 families residing in the CDP. The racial makeup of the CDP was 98.35% White, 0.14% African American, 0.07% Native American, 0.07% Asian, 0.14% from other races, and 1.22% from two or more races. Hispanic or Latino of any race were 0.94% of the population.

There were 694 households, out of which 8.9% had children under the age of 18 living with them, 57.8% were married couples living together, 5.5% had a female householder with no husband present, and 32.9% were non-families. 26.1% of all households were made up of individuals, and 18.2% had someone living alone who was 65 years of age or older.  The average household size was 2.00 and the average family size was 2.33.

In the CDP, the population was spread out, with 9.9% under the age of 18, 3.5% from 18 to 24, 12.3% from 25 to 44, 31.2% from 45 to 64, and 43.2% who were 65 years of age or older.  The median age was 62 years. For every 100 females, there were 102.9 males.  For every 100 females age 18 and over, there were 98.6 males.

The median income for a household in the CDP was $26,406, and the median income for a family was $28,047. Males had a median income of $36,563 versus $25,726 for females. The per capita income for the CDP was $16,475.  About 13.5% of families and 19.4% of the population were below the poverty line, including 29.0% of those under age 18 and 18.2% of those age 65 or over.

References

Census-designated places in Glades County, Florida
Census-designated places in Florida
Populated places on Lake Okeechobee